Lovestruck means having mental and physical symptoms associated with falling in love.

Lovestruck or Love Struck may also refer to:

Music
 "Love Struck", a 2009 song by V Factory
 "Love Struck" (WSTRN song), a 2018 song by WSTRN
 "Love Struck", a 1988 song by Jesse Johnson
 "Lovestruck" (Madness song), a 1999 song by Madness
 "Lovestruck" (Duffy song), from the 2010 album Endlessly

Other uses
 Lovestruck: The Musical, a 2013 American musical
 Lovestruck.com, an online dating site
 Love-Struck, a 1997 original film by the Freeform cable network

See also